Banningham is a village and former civil parish, now in the parish of Colby, in the North Norfolk district, in the English county of Norfolk. The village is 2.9 miles north east of Aylsham, 14.7 miles north of Norwich and 129 miles north east  of London. The nearest railway station is at North Walsham Railway station where the Bittern Line from Cromer to Norwich can be accessed and the national rail network beyond. The nearest airport is Norwich International Airport. The village lies a small distance east from the A140 Cromer to Norwich road. In 1931 the parish had a population of 207.

History
Banningham has an entry in the Domesday Book of 1086. In the great book Banningham is recorded by the names Banincha, and Hamingeha. The main landholders are William de Warenne and the Abbot of Holm. The main tenant is Roger holding his land from Reynald FitzIvo.

The villages name means 'Homestead/village of *Ban(n)a's people'.

On 1 April 1935 the parish was abolished and merged with Colby.

Amenities
The village has a thriving village hall that holds all kinds of events weekly and annually
The village pub dates from the 17th century and is called The Crown. The pub has a good selection of real ale and is listed by CAMRA. The pub serves food and often has live music and quizzes.

Saint Botolph parish church
The parish church dates from the 14th century. The church's most notable feature is its steep-pitched hammerbeam roof with seven angels along each side. The spandrels are adorned with tracery in wheels and other elaborate forms. Two of the windows have 15th-century glass in the tracery. In the north window, stained glass depicts Archangel Gabriel calling Mary. The interior also has several wall paintings, notably one of Saint George slaying the Dragon, and one of the feet of Saint Christopher.  The church is a Grade I listed building .

Notable people
Edward Bickersteth (1850–1897) was the founder of the Cambridge Mission to Delhi and in 1886 appointed Bishop of South Tokyo. He was a leading figure in the early years of the Anglican Church in Japan. He was born at Banningham where his father Edward Henry Bickersteth served as curate at St Botolph's Church.  The elder Bickersteth, a noted poet and Cambridge scholar, was appointed Bishop of Exeter from 1885 to 1900.

War Memorial
Banningham's War Memorial takes the form of a wooden plaque in St. Botolph's Church. It holds the following names for the First World War:
 Lance-Corporal S. C. Plume (d.1918), 7th Battalion, Northamptonshire Regiment
 Lance-Corporal E. D. Sayer (d.1918), 10th Battalion, Essex Regiment
 Private G. William Newstead (1895-1919), Labour Corps
 Private Frederick W. Plume (1890-1917), 54th Company, Machine Gun Corps
 E. Allen
 R. J. Atkins
 A. E. Howard
 A. Pardon

And the following name for the Second World War:
 Fusilier Frank R. Shingles (1925-1944), 2nd Battalion, Royal Fusiliers

References

External links

 

Villages in Norfolk
Former civil parishes in Norfolk
North Norfolk